Weddings Play Sports (and Falcons) is a mini-album released by Australian rock band Weddings Parties Anything of cover songs of two Australian bands, The Sports and The Falcons.

The album title is reminiscent of an album released by The Sports - The Sports play Dylan (and Donovan)

Track listing
 "Reckless" (Ed Bates, Stephen Cummings, Andrew Pendlebury)
 "Softly, Softly" (Stephen Cummings, Andrew Pendlebury)
 "Stop the Baby Talking" (Stephen Cummings, Andrew Pendlebury)
 "So Young" (Jeff Burstin, Joe Camilleri, Tony Faehse)
 "Strangers on a Train" (Martin Armiger)
 "Last House on the Left" (Stephen Cummings, Andrew Pendlebury)

Charts

References

Weddings Parties Anything albums
1990 albums